Jesse Mermuys (born ) is an assistant coach for the Orlando Magic.  He was a former assistant coach for the Sacramento Kings, Houston Rockets and the Toronto Raptors.

Coaching career

Denver Nuggets
Mermuys spent four seasons with the Nuggets as assistant video coordinator. He spent some time as the advance scout for the team.

Toronto Raptors
Mermuys was hired by Dwane Casey (the head coach) to serve under him. Mermuys began his tenure as assistant coach in the 2013–14 NBA season.

Raptors 905
On July 7, 2015, Mermuys was named the head coach and assistant general manager for Raptors 905 of the NBA D-League.

Los Angeles Lakers
On July 1, 2016, Mermuys was hired as an assistant coach for the Los Angeles Lakers.

Sacramento Kings
On May 29, 2019, Mermuys joined the Sacramento Kings as an assistant coach.

Orlando Magic
On August 8, 2021, Mermuys joined the Orlando Magic as an assistant coach.

References

External links
 Lakers Go, Los Angeles Lakers Assistant Coach (Spanish)

1980s births
Living people
American expatriate basketball people in Canada
American basketball scouts
Denver Nuggets scouts
High school basketball coaches in the United States
Houston Rockets assistant coaches
Junior college men's basketball coaches in the United States
Los Angeles Lakers assistant coaches
Raptors 905 coaches
Southern Utah Thunderbirds men's basketball coaches
Sacramento Kings coaches
Toronto Raptors assistant coaches
University of Arizona alumni